Clyde Middleton (January 30, 1928 - July 12, 2019) was an American politician in the state of Kentucky. He served in the Kentucky Senate as a Republican from 1968 to 1986.

References

1928 births
2019 deaths
Republican Party Kentucky state senators